On December 18, 2022, the New England Patriots of the National Football League (NFL), who were playing the Las Vegas Raiders, attempted a lateral pass play at the end of regulation with the score tied at 24–24. However, the play failed as Raiders defender Chandler Jones intercepted the Patriots' second lateral pass and ran the ball in for a walk-off touchdown.

The play has been referred to as the Lunatic Lateral, the Las Vegas Lateral, Col-lateral Damage, the Hail Moron, the Vagary in Vegas, the Sin City Miracle, and the Flick Six by various media outlets. The play quickly became notable due to its unusual result and circumstances and having taken place just over four years after the Miracle in Miami, a successful lateral play (which the Patriots coincidentally also lost), though this play resulted in the opposite outcome. Several analysts criticized the Patriots for attempting the play, which is normally attempted only when the team is trailing in the final seconds of a game, with the game tied and have considered it one of the worst in NFL history.

Background
During the 2018 NFL season, the Patriots had fallen victim to a successful lateral pass play by the Miami Dolphins, who scored a last-minute game-winning touchdown off the hook-and-ladder play to win in week 14 of that year. This Patriots–Raiders game coincidentally occurred just over four years to the date of the Miracle in Miami. Additionally, this was the first time the Patriots played against the Raiders with their former Offensive Coordinator Josh McDaniels as Head Coach.

Game details

Lead up
The Raiders took a commanding 17–3 lead at halftime, but a pick-six thrown by Derek Carr to Patriots safety Kyle Dugger sparked 21 unanswered points by the Patriots, who capped off a 24–17 lead with a Rhamondre Stevenson touchdown run and a successful two-point-conversion pass from Mac Jones to Jakobi Meyers. With only 32 seconds remaining, the Raiders would tie the game up with a Carr touchdown pass to Keelan Cole, which was arguably caught out of bounds as Cole's foot stepped on the outer boundary of the end zone but ruled a touchdown.

The Patriots would receive the ensuing kickoff at their own 25-yard-line with a touchback. They drove to their own 45-yard-line before two incomplete passes set them up with a 3rd-and-10.

The play
With just three seconds left in regulation and the score tied at 24–24, Jones took the snap and handed the ball off to Stevenson on a draw play with the Raiders playing in prevent defense, presumably to run the clock out and send the game to overtime. Stevenson eluded several Raiders defenders and ran the ball 23 yards towards the right sideline to the Las Vegas 32-yard-line. With Raiders safety Duron Harmon closing in, Stevenson pitched the ball to Meyers, who ran back to the 40-yard-line before throwing the ball towards the middle of the field and roughly 12 yards backwards towards Mac Jones' vicinity, unaware that Raiders defender Chandler Jones, who had just earlier missed a tackle on Stevenson during the play, was guarding him. Chandler Jones intercepted the ball and stiff-armed Mac Jones to the ground before running the ball back to the New England endzone for the Raiders' improbable game-winning touchdown.

Chandler Jones, who had played for the Patriots from 2012 to 2015, was officially credited with a fumble recovery instead of an interception despite Meyers' lateral never hitting the ground, due to the backwards motion of the ball. He later described to Peter King of NBC Sports:

Box score

Reactions

Broadcast calls of the play

TV (Fox)

Radio (Patriots)

Radio (Raiders)

Players and coaches
Following the game, several Patriots players and head coach Bill Belichick took responsibility for the botched lateral play. Stevenson regretted pitching the ball to Meyers instead of simply running out of bounds and sending the game to overtime, saying that he should have "known the situation," and Meyers stated "I was trying to do too much…Trying to be a hero, I guess". He also stated that the team did not intend to execute a lateral pass during that final play. Mac Jones stated that he should have made the tackle on Chandler Jones, and Belichick stated that the Patriots made a "mistake" and "needed to be better in situational football." When asked why the Patriots did not attempt a Hail Mary pass, Belichick offered "Taking a shot at the end zone? We couldn't throw it that far," in reference to the nearly 60-yard distance required for the touchdown.

Former Patriots Tom Brady and Julian Edelman offered their opinions on the lateral play, as both were on the team during the Miracle in Miami. Brady specifically mentioned his experience of being at the losing end of the Miracle in Miami and relayed his reaction to watching the "Lunatic Lateral" on game highlight videos but also expressed faith in Belichick in rallying the Patriots after the botched play. Edelman suggested that Mac Jones should have tripped Chandler Jones to avoid the humiliation of being stiff-armed to the ground and being scored on, though that would have resulted in a 15-yard penalty for New England and nonetheless given the Raiders the chance to win with a field goal attempt.

During that week's Monday Night Football game between the Green Bay Packers and the Los Angeles Rams, Packers cornerback Rasul Douglas, who likewise lateralled the ball after making an interception in the game, stated his regret for doing so as the lateral pass was nearly recovered by Los Angeles but was picked up by his teammate Adrian Amos. Douglas stated "As I was going down, I underhanded it and then I seen it hit the ground. And I was like, 'Damn, this is about to be like the Raiders and Patriots'", also mentioning that his teammates "gave him a hard time" him for his lateral pass. NBC Sports Boston mentioned of the Patriots' lateral and how it related to Douglas' play and comments: "Simply put, the Patriots' loss was one of the most embarrassing of the Bill Belichick era and will be used as an example of what not to do for years to come."

Media
The day after the game, ESPN's Stephen A. Smith called the lateral play, especially Meyers' pass, the "dumbest play ever in NFL history", also opining that Stevenson, who had a strong game, did not need to pitch it to Meyers in the first place, especially as the game was tied. Although he applauded Meyers taking full responsibility for the play, Smith also remarked that Meyers' name would be "written all over" the now-infamous play, calling it "dumber" than the Butt Fumble. Similar sentiment was given by NFL Network's Rich Eisen, who dubbed the play the "Hail Moron" in reference to a Hail Mary pass and what he called the most "situationally boneheaded play... maybe ever" in contrast to the Patriots' usually disciplined play under Belichick. Charles Curtis of USA Today Sports countered that the Butt Fumble was a "delightful accident" compared to Meyers' lateral, but went on to compare the latter to the Colts Catastrophe, Leon Lett's Thanksgiving blunder, Dan Orlovsky's self-inflicted safety, and other inept plays in NFL history, saying the lateral belonged on the "Mount Rushmore of boneheaded plays". Richie Whitt of Sports Illustrated, writing for the publication's Pats Country blog on Fan Nation and having coined the "Lunatic Lateral" moniker, mentioned that there were multiple culprits in the failed play and declined to pin it all on Meyers, but also blamed Belichick for needing to be better at "situational coaching", in reference to his earlier quote about "situational football" and not trusting Mac Jones to throw a potential Hail Mary pass.

Fans
Within moments of the play, fan reactions were all over social media. One Patriots fan in particular, who was at Allegiant Stadium when the play happened, was constantly heckled by a Raiders fan during the game and especially during the play, with video from another spectator recording the incident, but the Patriots fan, who later self-identified as Jerry Edmond after numerous Twitter users expressed sympathy in response to the video, remained calm and did not retaliate against the unnamed woman. After viewing the video of Edmond, which was viewed 17.8 million times, Patriots owner Robert Kraft commended Edmond for his composure and personally called him, giving him free tickets to the Patriots' home game against the Cincinnati Bengals the following week, which Edmond accepted, watching the game from the press box with Kraft. Raiders president Sandra Douglass Morgan also praised Edmond for his composure, tweeting "On behalf of the Raiders, we appreciate the way you conducted yourself. No fan should have to endure that type of behavior. We will be in touch."

Aftermath
With the game-winning touchdown, the Raiders defeated the Patriots for the first time since 2002, when they were still based in Oakland, California. They kept their faint playoff hopes alive while improving to 6–8. Meanwhile, the loss dropped New England to 7–7, dropping the team one spot out of playoff seeding and hurting their overall postseason chances. The Patriots remained ahead of Las Vegas in the playoff hunt due to still having a better record at the time, although the Raiders would have a tiebreaker by virtue of the head-to-head win if the teams were to be tied in the standings. Both the Patriots and Raiders wound up missing the postseason, but the lateral play and resulting loss to Las Vegas was cited as a key factor in why the Patriots missed out, along with several other close losses throughout the course of the season.

See also
Lateral pass
Miracle in Miami
River City Relay
Butt Fumble
Colts Catastrophe

References

New England Patriots
Las Vegas Raiders
American football incidents
2022 National Football League season
December 2022 sports events in the United States
2022 in sports in Nevada
National Football League games